David or Dave Warner may refer to:

Sports
 Dave Warner (strongman) (born 1969), Northern Ireland strongman competitor
 David Bruce Warner (born 1970), South African alpine skier
 David Warner (cricketer) (born 1986), Australian cricketer

Others
 David Warner (actor) (1941–2022), British actor
 David William Warner (born 1941), former Speaker of the Ontario, Canada legislature
 Dave Warner (musician) (born 1953), Australian rock musician and author
 Dave Warner, neuroscientist and leader of the Afghanistan aid group Synergy Strike Force

See also 
David Werner (disambiguation)
David Warner Hagen (born 1931), American judge